Literatura Foiro (English: Literary Fair) is a bi-monthly periodical of Esperanto culture in the Esperanto language.

History
In 1970, the magazine was founded by the literature circle La Patrolo in Milan. The magazine publishes articles on international literature, cinema, music, performing arts, sociology, linguistics and philosophy. It has been the official magazine of the Esperanto PEN Centre in La Chaux-de-Fonds since 1991.

Editors-in-chief
Giorgio Silfer, 1970–1980
Perla Martinelli, 1980–1995
Ljubomir Trifonĉovski, 1996–2013
Carlo Minnaja, 2014
Zlatoje Martinov, 2015–2018
Perla Martinelli, 2019–present

References

Esperanto
Esperanto magazines